Surazhsky District is an administrative and municipal district (raion), one of the twenty-seven in Bryansk Oblast, Russia. It is located in the west of the oblast. Its administrative center is the town of Surazh. Population:   27,223 (2002 Census);  The population of Surazh accounts for 50.0% of the district's total population.

Ecological problems 
As a result of the Chernobyl disaster on April 26, 1986, part of the territory of Bryansk Oblast has been contaminated with radionuclides (mainly Gordeyevsky, Klimovsky, Klintsovsky, Krasnogorsky, Surazhsky, and Novozybkovsky Districts). In 1999, some 226,000 people lived in areas with the contamination level above 5 Curie/km2, representing approximately 16% of the oblast's population.

References

Notes

Sources

Districts of Bryansk Oblast